Drum is a surname. Notable people with the surname include:

 Andrew B. Drum (1883–1955), officer in the United States Marine Corps
 Augustus Drum (1815–1858), Democratic member of the U.S. House of Representatives from Pennsylvania
 Chris Drum (born 1974), New Zealand cricketer
 Damian Drum (born 1960), Australian politician and former footballer and coach
 George W. Drum (1925–1997), early leader in automobile club circles
 Henry Drum (1857–1950), American politician
 Hugh Aloysius Drum (1879–1951), American general for whom Fort Drum is named
 Joseph Drum (1874–1926), American footballer and coach
 Julius Drum (1958–2007), Native American actor
 Kevin Drum (born 1958), American political blogger
 Marcus Drum (born 1987), Australian footballer
 Maximilian Drum (born 1991), German footballer 
 Richard C. Drum (1825–1909), Adjutant General of the United States Army from 1880 to 1889

See also
 Drum
 Drum (disambiguation)
 Drummond (surname)